The 1938–39 Washington Huskies men's basketball team represented the University of Washington for the  NCAA college basketball season. Led by nineteenth-year head coach Hec Edmundson, the Huskies were members of the Pacific Coast Conference and played their home games on campus at the UW Pavilion in Seattle, Washington.

After a six-game winning streak, Washington was a game behind leader Oregon with two games remaining, both against the Webfoots in Seattle. Oregon won the first to clinch the title, then won the finale as well; they went on to win the conference title (swept California) and the first NCAA tournament, which had an eight-team field.

References

External links
Sports Reference – Washington Huskies: 1938–39 basketball season
Washington Huskies men's basketball media guide (2009–10) – History

Washington Huskies men's basketball seasons
Washington Huskies
Washington
Washington